Ottavio Orsini (1585–1640) was a Roman Catholic prelate who served as Bishop of Segni (1632–1640)
and Bishop of Venafro (1621–1632).

Biography
Ottavio Orsini was born in 1585 and ordained a priest in 1618.
On 13 Sep 1621, he was appointed during the papacy of Pope Gregory XV as Bishop of Venafro.
On 21 Sep 1621, he was consecrated bishop by Roberto Ubaldini, Bishop of Montepulciano, with Pietro Antonio Da Ponte, Bishop of Troia, and Fabrizio Landriani, Bishop of Pavia, serving as co-consecrators. 
On 20 Sep 1632, he was appointed during the papacy of Pope Urban VIII as Bishop of Segni.
He served as Bishop of Segni until his death in 1640.

While bishop, he was the principal co-consecrator of Felice Franceschini, Bishop of Andria (1632); Orazio Muscettola, Bishop of Trevico (1636); and Maurizio Ragano, Bishop of Fondi (1636).

References

External links and additional sources
 (for Chronology of Bishops) 
 (for Chronology of Bishops)  

17th-century Italian Roman Catholic bishops
Bishops appointed by Pope Gregory XV
Bishops appointed by Pope Urban VIII
1585 births
1640 deaths